Vanderbilt may refer to:

People
Vanderbilt (surname)
Vanderbilt family

Places
In the United States:
Vanderbilt, California, a former gold-mining town 
Vanderbilt, Michigan, a village
Vanderbilt, Nevada, a ghost town
 Vanderbilt Mansion National Historic Site, Hyde Park, NY
Vanderbilt, Texas, a census-designated place
Vanderbilt, Pennsylvania, a borough
Vanderbilt Avenue, three New York City streets
Vanderbilt University, a private research university in Nashville, Tennessee, USA
Vanderbilt Commodores, the athletics program of Vanderbilt University
Vanderbilt Museum, in Centerport, New York, built with a bequest from William Kissam Vanderbilt II

Other uses
One Vanderbilt, a skyscraper in New York City
Vanderbilt Club, a bidding system in the game of contract bridge, devised by Harold S. Vanderbilt
Vanderbilt Cup, in American auto racing
George Vanderbilt Sumatran Expedition
Vanderbilt Mortgage and Finance, specializes in mortgages for manufactured homes
Vanderbilt Prep, a fictitious private school in Degrassi
Vanderbilt Trophy, a bridge-playing tournament
Vanderbilt Tender, a type of steam locomotive tender with a round water tank
USCS Vanderbilt, a survey ship in service with the United States Coast Survey from 1842 to 1855
USS Vanderbilt, a passenger steamship converted to a cruiser during the American Civil War

See also
 Biltmore (disambiguation)
"Mrs Vandebilt", a song from the Paul McCartney and Wings album Band on the Run